The following are the winners of the 3rd annual (1976) Origins Award, presented at Origins 1977:

Charles Roberts Awards

Adventure Gaming Hall of Fame Inductee
 Tom Shaw

External links
 1976 Origins Awards Winners

1976 awards
 
1976 awards in the United States